The Front for Democracy in Burundi–Nyakuri (FRODEBU-Nyakuri), also known as Sahwanya Frodebu Iragi rya Ndadaye, is a political party in Burundi.

History
The party was established in June 2008 as a breakaway from the Front for Democracy in Burundi (FRODEBU) by Jean Minani and eleven other party members. Supportive of the governing CNDD–FDD, it took the name "Nyakuri", meaning "genuine".

Although the 2010 parliamentary elections were boycotted by the opposition, FRODEBU-Nyakuri contested the elections, winning five of the 106 seats in the National Assembly.

References

Political parties in Burundi
Political parties established in 2008
2008 establishments in Burundi